VASVIK Industrial Research Award is an Indian award, instituted to recognize and promote excellence in industrial research in the areas of science and technology. The award is given annually to individuals or groups and carries a citation and a cash prize of  100,000.

Profile
VASVIK awards have been instituted by Vividhlaxi Audyogik Samshodhan Vikas Kendra (VASVIK), a non profit making non governmental organization established in 1974 by the Mumbai based business family of Patels, headed by Mohan Patel, an ex Sheriff of Mumbai, who is credited with the development of the first ophthalmic nozzle pure aluminum tube. The awards are annual in cycle and have been instituted with a view to promote industry based research in India in the fields of science and technology. Nine categories have been identified for the awards and individuals and groups are eligible for the awards, except one, which is reserved for women scientists. The awardees are selected by a Board of Advisors nominated by the organization. The awards honour innovation in design and production techniques which foster economic growth of the country by way of import substitution, reduction of manufacturing costs and foreign exchange saving.

Categories
The awards are distributed in nine categories of which 8 are open categories and Chandaben Mohanbhai Patel Industrial Research Award is extended to women scientists only.

 Agricultural Sciences and Technology
 Biological Sciences and Technology
 Chemical Sciences and Technology
 Electrical and Electronic Sciences and Technology
 Environmental Sciences and Technology
 Mechanical and Structural Sciences and Technology
 Information and Communication Technology
 Materials Sciences and Technology
 Chandaben Mohanbhai Patel Industrial Research Award for Women Scientists

Recipients

Agricultural Sciences and Technology

Biological Sciences and Technology

Chemical Sciences and Technology

Electrical and Electronic Sciences and Technology

Environmental Sciences and Technology

Mechanical and Structural Sciences and Technology

Information and Communication Technology

Materials Sciences and Technology

Chandaben Mohanbhai Patel Industrial Research Award for Women Scientists

See also

 List of physics awards

References

Indian science and technology awards
Indian awards
Awards established in 1976
Physics awards
Research in India
Research awards
1976 establishments in Maharashtra